The Itata River flows in the Ñuble Region, southern Chile.

Until the Conquest of Chile, the Itata was the natural limit between the Mapuche, located to the south, and Picunche, to the north.

See also
Itata
List of rivers in Chile

References
 (December 2004). Cuenca de rio Itata

External links 
  Google Map of Itata River

Rivers of Chile
Rivers of Ñuble Region